Francisco Ignacio (de) Alcina SJ (also Alzina, Alçina) (February 2, 1610 – July 30, 1674) was a Spanish historian and a Jesuit missionary in the Philippines. He served as parish priest in the Visayan islands for 37 years. Most of those years were spent among the natives whom he used to call "my beloved Bisayans."

Early life

Birth and education
Francisco Ignacio Alzina was born on February 2, 1610, in Gandía, Valencia, Spain. He was one of the eight boys; six of his brothers died at an early age. At the age of 14, Alzina entered the Jesuit Province of Aragon and he was only 22 years old, a cleric in theological studies, when he was chosen for Philippine Missions.

Missionary life

Arrival in the Philippines 
In 1631, together with other Jesuit missionaries, he left Zaragoza and travelled to Mexico. Later that same year he left Acapulco and had first sight of the Philippine islands on May 15, 1632. Alcina arrived in Manila on May 26 and stayed two and a half years where he completed his studies and until his ordination. Alcina was ordained by Augustinian Bishop D. Fe. Pedro de Arce, who had been a catechist and pastor in the Bisayan Islands for a long time.

Bisayan missions 

After his ordination, he was first assigned in Borongan, Samar or Ibabao (Ybabao), as that eastern coast was called in olden times.

Alcina's assignments 1637 – 1668

Notable work 

Alcina spent most of his time documenting the general information of the Visayas and its people, including language, arts, science and their ancient traditions.

Alcina documented East Visayan literature including the poetic forms such as the candu, haya, ambahan, canogon, bical, balac, siday and awit. He also described the susumaton and posong, early forms of narratives.

  
Part I  = The location, the fertility and the nature of the Visayas and its inhabitants.
Part II = the Supernatural and ecclesiastical

Citations

References

External links 
 Alcina

Spanish Roman Catholic missionaries
17th-century Spanish historians
Authors of Spanish ethnographic accounts of the Philippines in the 16th century
1674 deaths
1610 births
17th-century Spanish Jesuits
Spanish expatriates in the Philippines
Jesuit missionaries in the Philippines